Scaevola collina, is a species of flowering plant in the family Goodeniaceae. It is a small sub-shrub with blue to purplish flowers. It grows in South Australia.

Description
The stems are upright to ascending, needle-shaped, woody, smooth or with short, soft hairs.

Taxonomy and naming
Scaevola collina was first formally described in 1957 by  E.L.Robertson from an unpublished description by J.M.Black  and the description was published in Flora of South Australia. The specific epithet (collina) means "living on hills".

Distribution and habitat
This scaevola grows in the Musgrave Ranges and Tomkinson Ranges in scrub and woodland on rocky locations.

References

collina
Flora of South Australia
Asterales of Australia
Plants described in 1957